Dharm Adhikari is a 1986 Hindi-language action film, produced by U.V. Suryanarayana Raju under the Gopi Krishna Movies banner, presented by Krishnam Raju and directed by K. Raghavendra Rao. The film stars Dilip Kumar, Jeetendra, Sridevi in the pivotal roles and music composed by Bappi Lahiri. The film is a remake of the Telugu movie Bobbili Brahmanna (1984), starring Krishnam Raju, Sharada, Jayasudha , both movies are made by the same banner and director. Two roles of Dilip Kumar and Jeetendra are played by Krishnam Raju in Telugu.

Plot 
Dharamraj is a crownless king of Nandgaon, which was maintained from his forefathers. Neither a court nor a police station is located in that village. Dharamraj is the only judge and the commissioner of that village. Villagers bow in front of his judgement and accept it as God's judgement, and he also does justice to everybody and doesn't hesitate to give punishment whether he is poor or rich, or whether it's his own relative or his own blood. Everybody is happily living a fearless and peaceful life. They respect and worship Dharamraj as God, but Chaudhary and Shastri of the village are jealous of Dharamraj's popularity. They wait for the opportunity to bring him down from his justice seat and Chaudhary is having the dream of occupying it. Dharamraj has a wife called Savitri, a sweet and lovable daughter called Aarti and a strong and handsome brother called Prakash. Beautiful Priya and charming Sudha are the daughters of a poor villager. Chaudhary has a mischievous son called Chhote. Once, because of Chhote's mischief, Sudha lost her voice. Dharamraj gives the judgement that Chhote should marry dumb Sudha. This makes Chaudhary irritated and he becomes the enemy of Dharamraj. Later he learns that Dharamraj is maintaining a widow by visiting her and paying money monthly. He opens the affairs of Dharamraj in front of the villagers, but he fails. On one side, Priya and Prakash are loving each other and on another side, Aarti and Arun, son of the widow who is maintained by Dharamraj, are also. Chaudhary again plays a game and Dharamraj gives the judgement against his daughter that she should marry the same poor villager who lost his eyesight by Aarti. Prakash quarrels with Dharamraj and performs the marriage of Aarti and Arun. Dharamraj becomes ferocious and asks him to leave the village with Aarti and Arun. Savitri goes and performs the pregnancy ceremony of her daughter, on which Dharamraj sends her away from his house. Chaudhary and Shastri are very happy on their success and to end the last scene of their drama, they want to kill Arun and his mother. Prakash comes on the spot and saves them. Dharamraj also joins hands with Prakash. Dharamraj kills Chaudhary and surrenders to the police.

Cast 

Dilip Kumar as Dharamraj
Jeetendra as Prakash
Sridevi as Priya
Pran as Chaudhary
Kader Khan as Shastri
Shakti Kapoor as Chhote Chaudhary
Sujit Kumar as Police Inspector
Asrani as Kallu
Rakesh Bedi as Lallu
Rohini Hattangadi as Savitri
Dinesh Hingoo as Shastri's friend
Shivraj as Narayan's father
Priti Sapru as Sudha
Anuradha Patel as Aarti
Gita Siddharth as Susheela
Dulari as Narayan's mother
Heera Rajagopal as Susheela's daughter
Jayshree T. as Chhabili

Soundtrack 
Music composed by Bappi Lahiri. Lyrics were written by Indivar.

Production 
Krishnam Raju considered Vinod Khanna and Dharmendra initially for the lead roles, but later Dilip Kumar and Jeetendra were finalised.

Trivia 
In Bobbili Brahmanna, the two lead roles are played by Krishnam Raju (as Double Role), while in Dharm Adhikari, the two roles are played by Dilip Kumar and Jeetendra.

References

External links 

1986 films
1980s Hindi-language films
1986 drama films
Indian drama films
Films directed by K. Raghavendra Rao
Films produced by Krishnam Raju
Films scored by Bappi Lahiri
Hindi remakes of Telugu films
Hindi-language drama films